Espejo de sombras, is a Mexican telenovela that aired on  Canal 4, Telesistema Mexicano in 1960.

Cast 
 Ofelia Guilmáin 
 Andrea Palma 
 Sergio Bustamante
 Adriana Roel
 Luis Lomelí
 Hortensia Santoveña
 Luis Bayardo
 Judy Ponte
 Aldo Monti
 Salvador Carrasco

External links 
 Data in IMDb

1960 telenovelas
Mexican telenovelas
Televisa telenovelas
Television shows set in Mexico City
1960 Mexican television series debuts
1960 Mexican television series endings
Spanish-language telenovelas